DRB may refer to:

 Defence Research and Development Canada, the Canadian Defence Research Board
 Deshastha Rigvedi Brahmins
 Deutsche Reichsbahn, the German Imperial Railways or its wartime locomotive classes such as the DRB Class 50
 Deutscher Richterbund, the German Association of Judges
 5,6-Dichloro-1-beta-D-ribofuranosylbenzimidazole, a chemical compound that inhibits gene transcription 
 Digital Radio Broadcast Specialist, a professional title regulated by the Society of Broadcast Engineers
 Distributed Ruby
 Douay–Rheims Bible
 DRB-HICOM, a Malaysian automotive company
 DRB Sports Cars, an Australian sports car company
 The Dublin Review of Books, a literary publication based in Ireland
 The IATA airport code for Derby Airport (Australia) in Western Australia